Susan Deborah Long (born April 4, 1960, in Glen Ridge, New Jersey) is an American cross-country skier who competed from 1983 to 1986. She finished seventh in the 4 × 5 km relay at the 1984 Winter Olympics in Sarajevo.

Long finished 17th in the 20 km event at the 1985 FIS Nordic World Ski Championships in Seefeld. Her best World Cup finish was 11th in a 5 km event in Czechoslovakia in 1984. She also competed collegiately at Middlebury College.

Cross-country skiing results
All results are sourced from the International Ski Federation (FIS).

Olympic Games

World Championships

World Cup

Season standings

References

External links
Women's 4 x 5 km cross-country relay Olympic results: 1976-2002 

American female cross-country skiers
Cross-country skiers at the 1984 Winter Olympics
Living people
1960 births
Olympic cross-country skiers of the United States
People from Glen Ridge, New Jersey
Middlebury College alumni
21st-century American women